The Pranhita River is the largest tributary of Godavari River covering about 34% of its drainage basin conveying the combined waters of the Penganga River, the Wardha River, and the Wainganga River. By virtue of its extensive network of tributaries, the river drains a large part of Vidarbha region in Maharashtra, as well as the southern slopes of the Satpura Range in southeast Madhya Pradesh. It flows along the border of Gadchiroli district in Maharashtra and Komaram Bheem Asifabad district in Telangana. The Pranahita sub-basin is the seventh largest in India, measuring about 109,078 km2, making it larger than the individual basins of significant rivers such as the Narmada River and Kaveri.

Origin

The Pranhita River begins at the confluence of two extensive rivers: the Wardha (catchment area: 46,237 km2) and the Wainganga (catchment area: 49,677 km2). This junction lies on the border between the states of Maharashtra and Telangana near TumdiHettty,Kouthala Mandal (near Sirpur (T)). Right at the onset, the river enjoys a wide river bed.

Course
The Pranhita River follows a short course of 113 kilometers, strictly adhering to the boundary between Gadchiroli district in Maharashtra and Komaram Bheem Asifabad,Mancherial, Jayashankar Bhupalapally districts in Telangana. The direction of flow is southward, unlike most rivers of the Deccan Plateau. Along its course, the river is flanked by thick forests and harbors a rich biodiversity of flora and fauna. After completing its short journey, the river empties itself into the Godavari River at Kaleswaram.

Dams
The Pranhita River currently does not have any dams built on it. However, a water project to construct a barrage is currently underway. This project, the Kaleshwaram Lift Irrigation Project, has an estimated cost of Rs. 38,500 crore and is a project the Indian state of Telangana.

Uses
The River is used for water transport between Sironcha and Kaleswaram. It is also one of twelve rivers in the Pushkaram, a festival in Hindu traditions. The pushkaram on Pranhita(pranati) will held immediate after sindhu river pushkaram, Pranhita river pushkaram assign with zodiac of Mena(pisces). Pushkaram of Pranhita in 2022 will be from 13 to 24 April.

References

Rivers of Maharashtra
Tributaries of the Godavari River
Rivers of India